Qinna is the set of joint lock techniques used in the Chinese martial arts to control or lock an opponent's joints or muscles/tendons so they cannot move, thus neutralizing the opponent's fighting ability. Qinna Shu ( meaning "technique") literally translates as lock catch technique. Some schools simply use the word na ("hold") to describe the techniques. Qinna features both standing and ground-based grappling techniques.

Some Chinese martial arts instructors focus more on their qinna techniques than others. This is one of the many reasons why the qinna of one school may differ from that of another. All martial arts contain qinna techniques in some degree. The southern Chinese martial arts have more developed qinna techniques than northern Chinese martial systems. The southern martial arts have much more prevalent reliance on hand techniques which causes the practitioner to be in closer range to their opponent. There are over 700 qinna traditional techniques found in all martial arts. In the Non-Temple White Crane style there are 150-200 qinna techniques alone. Along with Fujian White Crane, styles such as Northern Eagle Claw (Ying Jow Pai) and Tiger Claw (Fu Jow Pai) have qinna as their martial focus and tend to rely on these advanced techniques.

There is no universally accepted systemized form of qinna. Instead, each school varies depending on the instructor's training and/or personal preference of focus.

Chin-Na is the facet of Kung-Fu which involves grappling, joint locks, pressure points, take-downs, and throws for immobilizing an attacker. These techniques are derived from animal attributes such as the praying mantis hooking or eagle claw.

Today

The recent understanding that grappling is as important as striking, has also caused some Kung Fu systems to focus on their Chin Na techniques, even expanding the system by incorporating/developing new ones. This is one reason why Chin Na of one school differs from that of another. There are over 700 traditional techniques and countless more being developed/adopted, depending on the specific school.

Qinna and the development of Jujutsu

Qinna is also accredited in the development of Jujutsu. It is stated in numerous Japanese and Chinese documents, that Chen Yuan-Yun (Chin Gempin or Chen Yuan-Pin; 1587-1674) was the first to introduce Chinese ju techniques (柔道 Rou Dao) into Japan during the early to middle 1600’s. One such Japanese document is “Collections of Ancestor’s Conversations Volume 2.”

“Honcho Bugei Shoden” (also referred to as “Kanjo Shoden”) written by Hinatsu Shigetaka in 1716 states the following: Recently, Chin Gempin came to Japan and stayed at the Kokusa monastery, where he met three ronin: Fukuno Hichiroemon, Isogai Jirozaemon, and Miura Yojiemon. Chin Gempin told them that in China, there is an art of seizing a man. He said that he had seen it practiced and gave a brief example of the art. Chin Gempin also stated that he had not learned all of the principles of the art. Upon hearing this, the samurai further researched this art. Once achieving a degree of skill, the samurai founded the Kito-ryu school of Jujutsu.

This same story is repeated in various Japanese documents including Honcho Seji Danki, Bujutsu Ryusoroku, Roi Shintoryo Hisho, Kitoryu Kempohi, Kitoryu Toka Mondo, Owan Meisho Zue, and Zoin Kinsei Kijindenas. Rickson Gracie also attributes the Chinese with bringing the techniques of Jiu Jitsu into Japan, as stated on his website, when explaining the origin of Brazilian Jiu Jitsu.

Qinna Rou Dao can also be found in Shuai Jiao. Judo’s development was influenced by Kito-ryu. Similarities between Judo and Shuai Jiao are apparent through the common link with Qinna Rou Dao. The process of both of these arts becoming a sport further influenced similarities within their softer techniques.

See also
 Fu Jow Pai
 Nam Pai Tong Long
 Shuai Jiao
 Tanglangquan
 Ying Jow Pai
 Jujutsu
 Judo
 Aikido

References

External links
 Authentic Shaolin Chin Na - Liu Jin Sheng. CHIN NA FA: Skill of Catch and Hold /Shanghai, 1936 (Translated from Chinese)
 Chen-style taijiquan's characteristic qinna technique

Chinese martial arts terminology
Chinese martial arts
Joint locks